Meerbusch-Osterath is the only station in Meerbusch in the German state of North Rhine-Westphalia. It is located in the district of Osterath and lies at the Lower Left Rhine Railway (Linksniederrheinische Strecke) and on the Osterath–Dortmund Süd railway.

History

Meerbusch-Osterath station was opened on 26 January 1856 on the Lower Left Rhine Railway as Osterath station. From 1866, it was also the starting point of the Osterath–Dortmund Süd railway. In 1980, it was renamed Meerbusch-Osterath as a result of the foundation of the city of Meerbusch.

Accidents and incidents
On 5 December 2017, a passenger train ran into the rear of a freight train near Meerbusch. Forty-seven people were injured.

Location and structure 

The station is located on the eastern edge of Osterath on the road connecting Meerbusch and Willich. The entrance building Is now used as a restaurant.

Services

Osterath is served by two Regional-Express services. The RE 7 connects with Krefeld, Neuss and Cologne and the RE 10 with Kleve, Krefeld and Düsseldorf.

Bus services
The station is accessible by bus at the Osterath Bf. and the Osterath, Bahnhofsweg stops. These two bus stops are served by two bus routes, 071 and 832. Route 071 is a regional route and connects the station with Viersen and Willich in the west and with Haus Meer U-Bahn station in the east, where there is a connection to the Düsseldorf Stadtbahn line U76. Route 832 is a local route and connects the station with Meerbusch-Strümp and Meerbusch-Lank-Latum.

References

Railway stations in North Rhine-Westphalia
Railway stations in Germany opened in 1856
Buildings and structures in Rhein-Kreis Neuss